This list of Filipino writers is organized by the first letter in the surname.

 Francisco Arcellana
 Francisco Balagtas
 Lualhati Bautista
 Louis Bulaong
 Carlos Bulosan
 Cecilia Manguerra Brainard
 Linda Ty Casper
 Gilbert Luis R. Centina III 
 Jose Jason Chancoco
 Rin Chupeco
 Gilda Cordero-Fernando
 Luis G. Dato
 Edmundo Farolán
 Zoilo Galang
 Guillermo Gómez Rivera
 N. V. M. Gonzalez
 Jessica Hagedorn
 Nick Joaquin
 F. Sionil José
 Teresita Manaloto-Magnaye
 Resil Mojares
 Virginia R. Moreno
 Peter Solis Nery
 José Rizal
 Alejandro R. Roces
 Shirley Siaton
 Michelle Cruz Skinner
 Miguel Syjuco
 Jason Tanamor
 Lysley Tenorio
 Edilberto K. Tiempo

See also
List of Filipino women writers

Writers

Filipino